Dadeland North station is a station on the Metrorail rapid transit system in the Dadeland district of Glenvar Heights, Florida. This station is located at the intersection of South Dixie Highway (US 1) and Southwest 83rd Street on the Snapper Creek, two blocks north of Kendall Drive and two blocks south from the US 1–Snapper Creek Expressway (SR 878) junction. It opened to service May 20, 1984.

It is located along the border of Kendall and Glenvar Heights, two census-designated places. The station is in both areas.

Dadeland North serves the communities of Dadeland, Glenvar Heights, Kendall, and Pinecrest, as well as serving the Dadeland Station and Dadeland Mall shopping centers.

Station layout
The station has two tracks served by an island platform, with a parking garage immediately west of the platform.

References

External links

MDT – Metrorail Stations
 entrance from Google Maps Street View

Green Line (Metrorail)
Orange Line (Metrorail)
Metrorail (Miami-Dade County) stations in Miami-Dade County, Florida
Railway stations in the United States opened in 1984
1984 establishments in Florida
Kendall, Florida